With Neatness and Dispatch is a 1918 American silent comedy film directed by Will S. Davis and starring Francis X. Bushman, Beverly Bayne, and Frank Currier. It was released on April 15, 1918.

Cast list
 Francis X. Bushman as Paul Donaldson
 Beverly Bayne as Geraldine Ames
 Frank Currier as Roger Burgess
 Walter Miller as John Pierce
 Hugh Jeffrey as Inspector Corcoran
 Sylvia Arnold as Mary Ames
 Ricca Allen as Aunt Letitia
 Adella Barker as Fanny
 John Charles as "Slim" Keegan
 Arthur Housman as Burns
 Sidney D'Albrook as Daly

References

External links 
 
 
 

Films directed by Will S. Davis
Metro Pictures films
American silent feature films
American black-and-white films
Silent American comedy films
1918 comedy films
1918 films
1910s English-language films
1910s American films